Brink of Life, (and known as So Close to Life in the UK) is a 1958 Swedish drama film directed by Ingmar Bergman. Bergman won the Best Director Award and Andersson, Dahlbeck, Ornäs and Thulin won the Best Actress Award at the 1958 Cannes Film Festival.

Plot
Cecilia Ellius is admitted to a hospital after she has begun badly bleeding during her third month of pregnancy. She is accompanied by her husband, Anders. Before treatment, Cecilia asks Anders if he truly wants the child; Anders replies it is too late to have the discussion. Cecilia undergoes treatment; when she awakes, she realizes she has had a miscarriage. She tearfully tells hospital staff she had wanted the child but Anders did not, and that she knew the child would not be born with only one loving parent. Anders returns to the hospital, and Cecilia initiates a separation, saying she realized Anders did not truly love her as they arrived at the hospital.

Another patient, Hjördis, was admitted after she began bleeding during pregnancy. She tried to abort, but did not succeed. She's not married or engaged, doesn't want to have the child, and didn't tell her strict mother about it. Hospital staff tell her unmarried young mothers in Sweden no longer face the social stigma they once did, and Hjördis can find a house and daycare, but she still has doubts. Encouraged by Nurse Brita she calls her mother, who tells her to come home.

A third patient, Stina Andersson, is overdue in her pregnancy and is very excited to have her child. She's convinced she will have a boy and intends to name him after her loving husband Harry, who visits her. She gets castor oil and a glass of beer to speed delivery. Her contractions during labour become increasingly violent and excruciating. She is sedated and suffers a stillbirth. She is deeply traumatized and can barely speak. Dr. Nordlander tells her she and the fetus were healthy, but it wasn't meant to be.

Cast

Reception
Brink of Life received generally mixed reviews from critics.

Censorship
When Brink of Life was first released in Italy in 1960 the Committee for the Theatrical Review of the Italian Ministry of Cultural Heritage and Activities rated it as VM16: not suitable for children under 16. In order for the film to be screened publicly, the Committee imposed the removal of the scene in which Stina is in pain due to labour. The reason for the age restriction and removal of the scene cited in the official documents, is that the film was not suitable to the sexual morals of a minor in the Italian society, and the scene was considered to be shocking. The official document number is: 31260, it was signed on 20 April 1960 by Minister Domenico Magrì.

References

External links
 
 

1958 films
1958 drama films
1950s pregnancy films
1950s Swedish-language films
Swedish drama films
Swedish black-and-white films
Films directed by Ingmar Bergman
Films set in hospitals
Swedish pregnancy films
1950s Swedish films